Ballindooley, officially Ballindooly, is a village in County Galway, Ireland. It is north of Galway city and in the ecclesiastical parish of Castlegar. There is a 15th century castle in the area, Ballindooley Castle, which was refurbished and sold in late 2016.
The village itself is just off the Galway City to Headford (N84) road. Ballindooley Lake, which is sometimes referred to as Ballindooley Lough, is a small lake located southeast of the castle.

See also
 List of towns and villages in Ireland

References

Towns and villages in County Galway